Pilar Bosley (born September 4, 1988) is an American former competitive ice dancer who competed with John Corona.

Career 
Bosley competed with Peter Cook from 1999 to 2003.

She and Corona won the novice pewter medal at the 2005 U.S. Championships and competed for two seasons on the ISU Junior Grand Prix series, winning one medal. She and Corona announced the end of their partnership on April 8, 2008.

Personal life
Bosley grew up in Bel Air, Maryland. She attended St. Joseph's University.

Programs
(with Corona)

Competitive highlights
(with Corona)

References

External links

 Official site
 
 

1988 births
Living people
American female ice dancers
American sportspeople of Korean descent
People from Bel Air, Maryland
Saint Joseph's University alumni
21st-century American women